I Like It Loud is the debut extended play by Dutch DJ Tiësto. Released through his Musical Freedom record label on 30 March 2018, the EP features four songs.

Background
He announced the EP on social media on the 25th of March 2018, saying "Thank you @ultra! Excited to announce my new I Like It Loud EP drops this Friday March 30." The EP was described as "an explosive body of work, brimming with festival bangers." The title track from the EP is a remake of the song by Marshal Masters. The songs in the EP are of different genres - the first is of Melbourne bounce, the second is of progressive house, the third is of future house and the fourth is of big room house.

Track listing

References

2018 EPs
Tiësto EPs
Electronic dance music EPs
EPs by Dutch artists